Drypetes venusta is an evergreen tree species endemic to the Western Ghats, India. They are large trees with smooth, straight, and white trunk and horizontal branches. It can reach a height up to 35 m, and a girth up to 3 m.

Description 
The leaves are simple with alternate phyllotaxy and elliptic or elliptic oblong shape. Leaf size is about 5-12 × 2-5 cm. Leaf base is oblique, and apex is acute or shortly acuminate. There will be 8-12 pairs secondary nerves. The petiole length is 0.4-1 cm. Flowers are dioecious, and greenish yellow in colour. The male flowers are seen in axillary clusters with pedicel length of 1-1.5 cm. The female flowers are axillary, seen either solitary or in pairs, with pedicel length up to 6 cm. Fruit are ellipsoid or obovoid, green in colour, and drooping.

Distribution 
This is a common tree in low and medium elevation evergreen forests of Western Ghats from Lonavala to Thiruvananthapuram. The altitudinal range is from 200 m to 1200 m.

References 

elata
Flora of the Western Ghats
Taxa named by Robert Wight
Plants described in 1853